Celtis luzonica is a species of plant in the family Cannabaceae. It is endemic to the Philippines.  It is threatened by habitat loss.

References

Flora of the Philippines
luzonica
Vulnerable plants
Flora of Luzon
Taxonomy articles created by Polbot
Plants described in 1905